Chang Taek-sang or Jang Taek-sang (October 22, 1893 – August 1, 1969) was a Korean Independence activist and South Korean policeman and politician. He was the third prime minister of South Korea and 1st Minister of Foreign Affairs. His nickname was Changrang.

Life 
Chang held this position during the Korean War. He attended the University of Edinburgh, Scotland earlier in his life. Jang became First Minister of Foreign Affairs and Trade from August 15 to December 24, 1948 after the ministry was established on July 17, 1948. During his term, he was in charge of diplomacy for South Korea, as well as handling external trade and matters related to overseas Korean nationals (which was crucial during this period in Korea). From May 6, 1952 to October 6, 1952, he served as the prime minister of the First Republic of Korea.

Recently, in July 2006, Jang Byung-hye (Peggy Jang), the daughter of Jang Taek-sang, and Rhee In-soo, an adopted son of South Korea's first president Syngman Rhee, filed a lawsuit against the producers of Seoul 1945. They claimed that the drama distorts history and belittles the achievements of their late fathers.

Work book 
 South Koreas founding and me (대한민국 건국과 나, 1969)

Popular culture 
 Portrayed by Kim Dong-hyun in the 2006 KBS1 TV series Seoul 1945.

References

External links 
 
 Changrang Changtaeksang's memorial museum 
 Chang Taek-sang 
 Chang Taek-sang:Korean ihistorical information persons 
 Chang Taek-sang 

Prime Ministers of South Korea
1893 births
1969 deaths
Government ministers of South Korea
South Korean anti-communists
Kim Kyu-sik
Waseda University alumni
Alumni of the University of Edinburgh
People from North Gyeongsang Province
Members of the National Assembly (South Korea)
Foreign ministers of South Korea
Indong Jang clan